The Kalambo River forms part of the border between Zambia and Songwe Region, Tanzania. It is a comparatively small stream which rises on the Ufipa Plateau north-east of Mbala at an elevation of about 1800 m and descends into the Albertine Rift, entering the southeastern end of Lake Tanganyika at an elevation of about 770 m, in a straight-line distance of only about 50 km. This accounts for its main claim to fame, its waterfall, Kalambo Falls, which is Africa's second highest falls (after South Africa's Tugela Falls). Below the falls, the river runs in a deep gorge.

For more details see Kalambo Falls, including coverage of the important archaeological sites discovered there.

References 
 UNESCO, World Heritage Centre, Kalambo falls archaeological site (prehistoric settlement site), 11/06/1997.
 "Forestry." Encyclopædia Britannica. 2006. Encyclopædia Britannica Online. 17 June 2006  <http://search.eb.com/eb/article-26182>.

External links
 

 
Rivers of Zambia
Rivers of Tanzania
Tributaries of Lake Tanganyika
International rivers of Africa
Tanzania–Zambia border